Moraine Park may refer to:

Places and locations
 Moraine Park (Colorado) in Rocky Mountain National Park
 Moraine Park Museum and Amphitheater, located in Moraine Park in Rocky Mountain National Park
 Moraine Air Park in Ohio
 Moraine View State Recreation Area in Illinois

Parks
 Moraine Hills State Park in Illinois
 Moraine State Park in Pennsylvania

Schools
 Moraine Park Technical College in Wisconsin

Attractions
 Splash Moraine, a water park in Ohio